Axial spondyloarthritis (also often referred to as axSpA) is a chronic, autoinflammatory disease predominantly affecting the axial skeleton (sacroiliac joints and spine). The best-known member of the axial spondyloarthritis disease family is ankylosing spondylitis. Axial spondyloarthritis is an umbrella term that was introduced in 2009 to characterize a diverse disease family that share clinical and genetic features, such as the involvement of the axial skeleton. The expression was introduced in order to unify (1) less severe forms of spondylitis, (2) the early phase of ankylosing spondylitis as well as (3) ankylosing spondylitis itself into one term.

Classification
Axial spondyloarthritis can be divided into two classes:
 Non-radiographic axial spondyloarthritis (nr-axSpA): This term encompasses both the early disease stage of ankylosing spondylitis, in which no radiographic changes are visible yet, as well as less severe forms of ankylosing spondylitis.
 Radiographic axial spondyloarthritis:Synonym for ankylosing spondylitis. This class is termed radiographic axial spondyloarthritis due to the unambiguous diagnosis through radiographic changes in the sacroiliac joints and/or spine.

Diagnosis

Management
Traditional NSAIDs and COX-2 inhibitor NSAIDs are effective for treating axSpA. The potential harms may not differ when compared to a placebo treatment in the short term. Various NSAIDs are equally effective (e.g.: Cox2 NSAIDS and traditional NSAIDS). Continuous NSAID use may reduce radiographic spinal progression, but this requires confirmation.

In 2019 the American College of Rheumatology, Spondylitis Association of America and Spondyloarthritis Research and Treatment Network published updated recommendations for the treatment of the condition based un updated literature reviews.

History
In 1984, a joint effort led to the definition of specific classification criteria for ankylosing spondylitis, called the "Modified New York criteria". One of the central New York criteria was the existence of radiographically visible changes in the sacroiliac joints and/or spine, which have formed due to bone fusion, erosion and/or formation caused by the disease. Even though these criteria helped to improve uniformly define ankylosing spondylitis, such radiologic changes often only manifested several years after the first disease symptoms appeared. In order to be able to study also patients with early and less typical forms, new criteria were needed that could identify the disease already at an early stage. In 2009 the Modified New York criteria were extended by a broad set of new classification criteria that aimed to classify patients based on the presence of typical spondyloarthritis disease features. These included inflammatory back pain, family history for axial spondyloarthritis, response to treatment with nonsteroidal anti-inflammatory drugs (NSAIDs), history of or current inflammation in the joints (arthritis), tendon-bone attachment of the heel (enthesitis), or eyes (uveitis), bowel (inflammatory bowel disease), skin (psoriasis) or signs of elevated inflammation (C-reactive protein and erythrocyte sedimentation rate). Important parts of the ASAS axSpA criteria are the biomarker HLA-B27 and magnetic resonance imaging (MRI). The criteria can only be applied in people that have chronic back pain (at least 3 months duration) started before the age of 45 years and only in those patients that already have a diagnosis of axial SpA. Since the disease ankylosing spondylitis was still defined by the Modified New York criteria of 1984, there was the need to find a new disease term that would also include the less severe forms or early onset of ankylosing spondylitis. This expression was found in the umbrella term axial spondyloarthritis. The 2009 classification criteria are called the ASAS (Assessment of SpondyloArthritis international Society) axial spondyloarthritis criteria.

References 

Autoinflammatory syndromes